James Seaton (1804–1876) was a journalist and political figure in Newfoundland. He represented Burgeo-LaPoile in the Newfoundland and Labrador House of Assembly from 1859 to 1860.

He was editor of the St. John's Morning Courier from 1846 to 1849 and then was editor of the Times and General Commercial Gazette for six months. In 1856, he founded the Newfoundland Express and served as editor until 1876. Seaton also founded the Weekly Express which operated from 1858 to 1859. He resigned his seat in the Newfoundland assembly in 1860.

References 
 

1804 births
1876 deaths
Canadian newspaper journalists
Members of the Newfoundland and Labrador House of Assembly
19th-century Canadian journalists
Canadian male journalists
Journalists from Newfoundland and Labrador
19th-century Canadian male writers
Newfoundland Colony people